Francesc Bellmunt (born 1 February 1947 in Sabadell) is a Spanish screenwriter and film director from Catalonia.

Film director
 1975, Canet Rock
 1975, La Nova Cançó
 1977, La Torna
 1978, L'Orgia
 1979, Salut i força al canut
 1980, La quinta del porro
 1983, Pa d'àngel
 1984, Un parell d'ous
 1985, La ràdio folla (Radio speed)
 1988, El complot dels anells
 1988, Un negre amb un saxo
 1990, Rateta, rateta
 1993, Monturiol, el senyor del mar
 1995, Escenes d'una orgia a Formentera
 1996, Gràcies per la propina
 2002, Lisístrata

Film producer
 1988, El complot dels anells
 1988, Un negre amb un saxo
 1990, Rateta, rateta
 1993, Monturiol, el senyor del mar
 1995, Escenes d'una orgia a Formentera
 1996, Gràcies per la propina
 2000, Lisístrata (Lysistrata)

TV producer
 1994, Quin curs, el meu tercer (TV movie)  TVC
 1996, Junts (TV movie) TVC
 1999, Happy House (tv) (serie) TVE
 2001, Nines russes' (TV movie) TVC
 2006, Àngels i Sants'' (serie) TVC

External links
 

Film directors from Catalonia
Spanish film producers
1947 births
Living people